Pini is a 2010 web comedy series which was broadcast on Ynet. It was shot in London, Cambridge and Paris and was produced by Market Master. The Series was created and written by the star, Tomer Barzide. It is currently in its third season. It is widely regarded as a "pioneering project" in Israel.

Plot
The series follows Pini (Tomer Barzide) after he leaves military service as a cook in Israel and travels to London to become a successful chef (like Gordon Ramsay). He finds a flat share with Tom Jones (Tom Jones) as he struggles to adjust to life in London.

Production
The series was produced by Market Master. Production was carried out by Pini Productions over two months in London, Cambridge and Paris. It was shot in high density on Canon 550D DSLR cameras. The dialogue is a mixture of English, Hebrew and French.

Cast
Pini played by Tomer Barzide
Tom Jones played by Tom Jones
Carla played by Charlotte Beckett
Olive played by Catherine Gordon
Boss played by Daniel Moore
Mark played by Oliver Browne
Joseph played by Vauxhall Jermaine
Audrey played by Sara Ginac
Kasano played by Luca Pusceddu
Barman played by David Keenan
Michael played by Edward Eales-White
Checkout Guy played by Marcus Kai
Doctors Receptionist played by Kasha Bajor

Crew
Executive Producers - Udi Shadmi and Assaf Vidavsky
Writer and Director - Tomer Barzide
Director - Gille Klabin (first two episodes)
Line Producer - Sean Keane
Editor - Tom Jones
Camera Operator - Tom Bradley
Sound Recordist - Mario Percori (first two episodes) Stuart Gilfedder, Sean Keane
Sound Post - Motti Benny, Mario Pecori (first two episodes)
Casting - Rachael David
Original Music composed by Sass Hoory

Critical reception
The series was well received and gained much credit for its production value. Pini is the first web series in Israel which is considered to have TV production value. The show had wide interest from TV and print media, a substantial number of hits on Ynet, and a large following on its Facebook fan page.

Episodes

References

External links
Pini Ynet Web Site 
IMDb profile

2010 web series debuts
Comedy web series